, was a daimyō in Japan during the Edo period. Masanao's  daimyō family was descended from Minamoto Yasuuji (Seiwa-Genji). The descendants of Tsuchiya (1585–1612) lived successively at Kururi in Kazusa Province; after 1669 at Tsuchiura in Hitachi Province; after 1681 at Tanaka in Suruga Province; and then, after 1688, again at Tsuchiura in Hitachi.

He was the Tokugawa shogunate's Kyoto shoshidai in the period spanning October 19, 1686, through November 17, 1687.

Notes

References
 Meyer, Eva-Maria. (1999). Japans Kaiserhof in de Edo-Zeit: Unter besonderer Berücksichtigung der Jahre 1846 bis 1867. Münster: Tagenbuch. 
 Papinot, Edmund. (1906) Dictionnaire d'histoire et de géographie du japon. Tokyo: Librarie Sansaisha...Click link for digitized 1906 Nobiliaire du japon (2003)
 Sasaki, Suguru. (2002). Boshin sensō: haisha no Meiji ishin. Tokyo: Chūōkōron-shinsha.

Daimyo
Kyoto Shoshidai
Officials of the Tokugawa shogunate
1641 births
1722 deaths